Bedford County Airport  is a public airport in Bedford County, Pennsylvania. It is owned by the Bedford County Airport Authority and is five miles north of the borough of Bedford, Pennsylvania. It opened in 1994.

Most U.S. airports use the same three-letter location identifier for the FAA and IATA, but this airport is HMZ to the FAA and has no designation from the IATA.

Facilities
Its one runway, 14/32, is 5,005 by 75 feet (1,526 x 23 m) asphalt.

In the year ending February 5, 2009 the airport had 14,700 aircraft operations, average 40 per day: 88% general aviation, 8% air taxi and 3% military. 24 aircraft were then based at the airport: 67% single-engine, 8% multi-engine, 21% jet and 4% gliders.

References

External links 
 Aerial photo as of 27 April 1993 from USGS The National Map
 

Airports in Pennsylvania
County airports in Pennsylvania
Transportation buildings and structures in Bedford County, Pennsylvania
1994 establishments in Pennsylvania